The Streetly Academy (formerly known as The Streetly School) is a large co-educational secondary school in Streetly, West Midlands, England, on the border of Birmingham and Walsall local authorities. It was established in 1961.

In December 2012, the school was ranked as “Good” by OFSTED and became the first school in England to move from "Satisfactory" to "Outstanding" in 3 years under the new, more challenging framework introduced in 2012.
In 2019, after an Ofsted inspection, the school was given a "Needs to improve".

In 2014 Streetly was designated a National Teaching School, known as The Sutton Park Teaching School. It is also a National Support School.

The current headteacher is Billy Downie, a National Leader of Education. Previous headteachers include Debbie Hunton, Pat Walters (interim head) and David Binnie.

Notable former students include swimmer Tully Kearney, who won gold for Great Britain at the 2020 Tokyo Paralympics and Connie Talbot, an English singer who was the runner-up of the first series of Britain's Got Talent in 2007.

References

External links 
 
 Sutton Park Teaching School Alliance

1961 establishments in England
Educational institutions established in 1961
Secondary schools in Walsall
Sutton Coldfield
Academies in Walsall